Talat Xhaferi or Talat Dzhaferi (born 15 April 1962) is a Macedonian politician and the current President of the Assembly of the Republic of North Macedonia since 2017. He was also Minister of Defense from 2013 to 2014.

Early life and military career 
Xhaferi, an ethnic Albanian, was born on 15 April 1962 in the village of Forino near Gostivar, PR Macedonia, FPR Yugoslavia. He attended primary school in the nearby village of Čegrane and continued secondary education at the Belgrade Military High School. He studied at the Military Academy of the Land Army Infantry of the Yugoslav People's Army (JNA) in Belgrade and Sarajevo and specialised in command and staff duties at the General Mihailo Apostolski Military Academy in Skopje. From 1985 to 1991 he was a JNA officer, and from 1992 to 2001 an officer of the Army of the Republic of Macedonia (ARM).

During the 2001 insurgency, in which ethnic Albanian militants attacked security forces, Xhaferi was at first a senior officer in the ARM, commanding troops in the Tetovo barracks. On April 28, the day of the Vejce massacre, he was on duty as commander at the barracks. Several days later he deserted and joined the National Liberation Army (NLA),  an Albanian guerrilla group against the Republic of Macedonia, and became its commander of the 116th Brigade with the nickname of "Commander Forina", from his birthplace. He was later amnestied, following the Ohrid agreement.

Political career 
Xhaferi was first elected to the Macedonian parliament in 2002 for the Democratic Union for Integration (DUI), which was formed that year by members of the dissolved NLA. From 2004 to 2006 Xhaferi was Deputy Minister of Defence. From 2008 to 2013, Xhaferi was a Macedonian MP for the DUI party, allied with the conservative VMRO-DPMNE party.

In 2012, Xhaferi became known for his marathon speeches used as a filibuster tactic to blocking the adoption of a law on veterans that would have granted benefits to Macedonian war veterans. He blocked the draft at commission level by "reading poetry, citing foreign literature and reports on Macedonia, mumbling or simply remaining silent, waiting for the time to pass".

In 2013, Xhaferi was nominated by DUI for Minister of Defense in the Cabinet of Nikola Gruevski, after the resignation of the DUI party member Fatmir Besimi. The appointment of Xhaferi triggered protests by extremist Macedonian (in particular retired general Stojanče Angelov of the pro-veteran Dignity opposition party) and Albanian citizens. Xhaferi stated that his goal was to make the armed forces “a symbol of coexistence, tolerance and respect for differences”.

On 26 November 2019, an earthquake struck Albania. Xhaferi was part of a delegation of Albanian politicians from North Macedonia visiting the earthquake epicentre that expressed their condolences to Albanian president Ilir Meta.

President of the Assembly
In April 2017, Xhaferi was elected President of the Macedonian parliament, supported by a coalition of Albanian national parties and the opposition social-democratic SDSM party, sparking riots in the parliament building. The VMRO-DPMNE party labeled this move as a coup. Subsequently, demonstrators broke into the parliament building, beating journalists and MPs, and had to be cleared by the police.

References 

1962 births
Living people
Speakers of the Assembly of North Macedonia
Defence ministers of North Macedonia
Democratic Union for Integration politicians
2001 insurgency in Macedonia
People from Gostivar
Albanians in North Macedonia
Yugoslav People's Army personnel
21st-century Albanian politicians